Maxi Mühlner (born 3 February 2001) is a German handball player for Buxtehuder SV in the Frauen Handball-Bundesliga.

Mühlner reprensented the German junior national team, where she participated at the 2017 European Women's U-17 Handball Championship, winning the title. She also participated at the 2018 Women's Youth World Handball Championship, placing 5th.

In March 2021, she signed a 2-year contract with the Bundesliga club Buxtehuder SV. She has previously played for HC Leipzig, HSG Bad Wildungen and FC Midtjylland Håndbold in Denmark on youth level.

She is selected as part of the German pre-squad for the 2022 European Women's Handball Championship.

Achievements
Bundesliga:
Bronze: 2022
European Youth Championship:
Winner: 2017

References

External links

2001 births
Living people
German female handball players
People from Leipzig
Sportspeople from Leipzig